is the 30th Japanese single by South Korean boy band Tohoshinki, released on . The single was released as a re-cut from their greatest hits album Best Selection 2010, which was released one month earlier. "Toki o Tomete" was the last single to feature former band members Jaejoong, Yoochun, and Junsu.

The song was Tohoshinki's second song to be used in commercials for Menard Cosmetics. Tohoshinki's "Wasurenaide" was previously used in 2009.

Track listing

CD+DVD version

CD only version

Chart rankings

Oricon Charts (Japan)

Various charts

References 

TVXQ songs
2010 singles
Oricon Weekly number-one singles
Billboard Japan Hot 100 number-one singles
2010 songs
Rhythm Zone singles